Samantha Faber (born May 8, 1987) is an American ice hockey player. Faber competed for the New Hampshire Wildcats women's ice hockey program in Hockey East. During the 2007–08 season, Faber set an NCAA record (since tied) for most game-winning goals in one season with 13. She is a former member of the United States women's national ice hockey team. She was part of the gold medal winning roster at the 2008 IIHF World Women's Championships.

Early life
Faber was born in Mount Sinai, New York, Her father, Scott Faber, was a hockey letterwinner at Rochester Institute of Technology, and her brother Matt was a hockey letterwinner at Johnson & Wales University. She attended Northwood School, where she lettered in hockey (recording 75 points with 50 goals and 25 assists in her senior year), soccer, and lacrosse, graduating in 2005.

Ice hockey career
Faber majored in women's studies at New Hampshire University. She competed for the New Hampshire Wildcats women's ice hockey program in Hockey East from 2005–09, playing 133 games and scoring 189 total points, and was named a Hockey East First Team All Star each of her last three seasons. In 2005-06, she was No. 3 in the nation in rookie scoring. In 2006, she was Hockey East Rookie of the Year.  During the 2007–08 season, Faber set an NCAA record (since tied) for most game-winning goals in one season with 13. She is the 5th all-time scorer in NHU history, with 189 points in 143 games.

Faber was a member of the US Under-22 National Team in 2007 and 2008. She is also a former member of the United States women's national ice hockey team, and was part of the gold medal winning team at the 2008 IIHF World Women's Championships.

From 2010-11, Faber played for the Boston Blades of the Canadian Women's Hockey League (CWHL).

From 2015-18, she  played for the Connecticut Whale of the Premier Hockey Federation (PHF) as their forward and captain. In 2018, she was selected to the All Star team.

On June 21, 2021, Faber was named assistant coach of the University of New Hampshire women's ice hockey team for the 2021-22 season. 

Faber is also the Youth Hockey Director at SoNo Ice House South Norwalk, Connecticut, for Nanook Hockey.

Career stats

NCAA

USA Hockey

Awards and honors
2009 Hockey East First-Team All-Star
2008 New Hampshire Wildcats Karyn Bye Award
2008 Patty Kazmaier Memorial Award Top 10 Finalist
2008 Hockey East Tournament MVP
2008 Hockey East All-Tournament Team
2008 New England Hockey Writer's Association All-Star Team
2007 Hockey East First-Team All-Star
2007 Hockey East All-Tournament Team
2007 Hockey East Three Stars Award
2007 New England Hockey Writer's Association All-Star Team
2006 Hockey East Tournament MVP
2006 Hockey East All-Tournament Team
2006 Hockey East Rookie of the Year
2006 Hockey East All-Rookie Team honoree
February 2006 Hockey East Rookie of the Month
2006 All-USCHO Rookie Team

See also
List of select Jewish ice hockey players

References

External links
 
 
 

1987 births
American women's ice hockey forwards
Boston Blades players
Connecticut Whale (PHF) players
Ice hockey players from New York (state)
Jewish American sportspeople
Jewish ice hockey players
Living people
Premier Hockey Federation players
New Hampshire Wildcats women's ice hockey players
People from Mount Sinai, New York
University of New Hampshire alumni
21st-century American Jews
21st-century American women